Reginald Henry Callender (31 August 1892 – 5 October 1915) was an English amateur footballer who played in the Football League for Derby County and Glossop as an outside left. He represented the England amateur national team.

Personal life 
Callender attended Fitzwilliam and St John's Colleges and was a Cambridge Blue. Prior to the First World War, he worked as a teacher. On 4 December 1914, three months after the outbreak of the First World War, Callender was commissioned as a temporary second lieutenant in the Durham Light Infantry. He was deployed to France in August 1915 and was killed accidentally while explaining the mechanisms of a grenade in Nord on 5 October 1915. He was buried in Cite Bonjean Military Cemetery, Armentières.

Career statistics

References

1892 births
1915 deaths
Footballers from County Durham
English footballers
England amateur international footballers
Association football outside forwards
Stockton F.C. players
Glossop North End A.F.C. players
Derby County F.C. players
Northern Football League players
English Football League players
British Army personnel of World War I
Durham Light Infantry officers
British military personnel killed in World War I
Alumni of St John's College, Cambridge
Alumni of Fitzwilliam College, Cambridge
Deaths by hand grenade
Accidental deaths in France